Pocitos is also the colloquial name for the city of Salvador Mazza, Salta Province, Argentina

Pocitos is an upscale barrio of Montevideo and beach. Pocitos is located along the banks of the Rio de la Plata, and it borders Buceo to the east, Parque Batlle to the north, Tres Cruces, Cordón and Parque Rodó to the west and Punta Carretas to the south. The Rambla of Montevideo (promenade) runs through the neighborhood alongside the river.  Pocitos is characterized by its apartment buildings of 10 to 15 stories that face the Rambla providing views of  the beach and Rio de la Plata.

Playa Pocitos
Playa Pocitos  (Pocitos Beach) is frequented by the teenage population of Montevideo and is popular for soccer, volleyball, and nautical events.  Along the Rambla can be found many chic and fancy restaurants and shops which attract many people not only from other barrios of Montevideo but also those from neighbouring Argentina and Brazil.

Landmarks
Public spaces in Pocitos include Plaza Gomensoro and Villa Biarritz. 
Buildings of architectural interest include: Casa Darnaud (the Russian Embassy)  and the Casa Towers (the Italian Embassy). The following buildings, now used as residences or seats of businesses, that have been named as National Heritage Sites in 1986: the Casa Felipe Yriart, the Casa Casabó, and the Casa Williams. The Escuela Brasil, still in use as school, was named a National Heritage Site in 2002.

Educational facilities
 Colegio y Liceo Nuestra Señora de Fátima (private, Roman Catholic, Claretians) 
 German School of Montevideo (private, co-educational)

Places of worship
Church of St. John the Baptist, popularly known as "Iglesia de Pocitos" (Roman Catholic)
Church of Our Lady of Fatima (Roman Catholic, Claretians) 
Church of St. Alexander and St. Peter Claver (Roman Catholic) 
First Church of Christ, Scientist (Christian Science)
Yavne (Jewish)
Beit Jabad (Jewish-Chabad)

Further reading

Image gallery

References

External links

 Intendencia de Montevideo / Useful data / Pocitos
 Intendencia de Montevideo / Historia de Pocitos
 Revista Raices / Historia del barrio Los Pocitos
 More information about POCITOS Barrio - GuiaDePocitos.com 

Barrios of Montevideo
 
Beaches of Uruguay